Gharchistan or Gharjistan also known as Gharj Al-Shar was a medieval region on the north bank of the Murghab River, lying to the east of Herat and north of Hari River. It corresponds roughly to the modern Badghis Province of Afghanistan.

Sources

References

Geographic history of Afghanistan
Historical regions of Iran
Hazarajat